The 2013 Home United FC season involves Home United competing in the 2013 S.League. They are also competing in the 2013 Singapore Cup.

Squad

S.League squad

Transfers

Pre-season transfers

In

Out

Mid-season transfers

In

Out

Team statistics

Appearances and goals

Numbers in parentheses denote appearances as substitute.

Competitions

S.League

Matches

League table

Matches

Singapore Cup

Home United won 5-2 on aggregate.

Home United won 2-0 on aggregate.

Singapore League Cup

Group A

Matches

Quarter-finals

References

Home United
2013